Curtis Fagan (born September 1, 1979) is a former American football wide receiver in the Arena Football League who played for the New York Dragons and Arizona Rattlers. He played college football for the Oklahoma Sooners.

References

1979 births
Living people
American football wide receivers
New York Dragons players
Arizona Rattlers players
Oklahoma Sooners football players